Madhavrao Kinhalkar is a former Minister in Sharad Pawar Government. He is a member of the Bharatiya Janata Party after resignation from NCP.

Career 
He served as a Congress Member of the Legislative Assembly of Bhokar Constituency from 1991 through 1999. He served as Minister of State for Home Affairs, Revenue and Co-operation in the Maharashtra government from 1991 to 1995 headed by Sharad Pawar.

He was a Nationalist Congress Party leader, but in 2014 he joined the Bharatiya Janata Party at Mumbai.

In 2014, he contested from Bhokar (Vidhan Sabha constituency) as BJP Candidate against Ameeta Ashokrao Chavan unsuccessfully with securing 53,224 votes as running candidates.

Litigation surrounding "paid news" 

Kinhalkar is the main litigant in the Ashok Chavan Paid News case of 2009 Maharashtra Vidhan Sabha. He Independently contested against him in the 2009 assembly poll from Bhokar Assembly Constituency.

References 

1957 births
Living people
People from Nanded district
Marathi politicians
21st-century Indian politicians
Members of the Maharashtra Legislative Assembly
Bharatiya Janata Party politicians from Maharashtra
Nationalist Congress Party politicians from Maharashtra
Indian National Congress politicians